Karen Sillas is an American stage and film actress.

Early life
The daughter of a Greek father and a Swedish mother, Sillas was born in Brooklyn. She graduated from the Acting Conservatory of the State University of New York at Purchase.

Career
Sillas appeared in Hal Hartley's 1992 film Simple Men. In 1994, she starred in What Happened Was..., which won the Grand Jury Prize at the Sundance Film Festival and launched Sillas into primetime television. In CBS's critically acclaimed detective series Under Suspicion, Sillas portrayed Rose Phillips, the only female detective in an otherwise male-dominated squad room.
Sillas and Tom Noonan appeared in a virtual interview conducted by the film critic Sheila O'Malley, hosted by Film Forum, February 9, 2021, discussing the re-release of the digitized version of What Happened Was... on Film Forum's YouTube channel.

Filmography

Film

Television

References

External links

 Karen Sillas Current Month TV Schedule

Living people
People from Brooklyn
State University of New York at Purchase alumni
Actresses from New York City
American film actresses
American stage actresses
American television actresses
20th-century American actresses
21st-century American actresses
Speech coaches
American people of Greek descent
American people of Swedish descent
Year of birth missing (living people)